Surviving the Cut was a military documentary/reality television series produced by 2 Roosters Media for the Discovery Channel. It portrays the rigorous training programs of various elite forces of the United States armed forces. Season two premiered on the Discovery Channel on July 11, 2011 and ended on August 26, 2011.

Episodes

Season 1 
 "Ranger School" (08/18/10)
 "US Air Force Pararescue" (08/25/10)
 "US Marine Recon" (09/01/10)
 "Special Forces Divers" (09/08/10)
 "Navy EOD Final Certification" (09/15/10)
 "Marine Snipers" (09/22/10)

Season 2 
 "Naval Special Warfare Combatant Craft Crewman" (07/11/11)
 "US Army Sniper School" (07/18/11) 
 "US Air Force Special Operations Dive School" (07/25/11)
 "US Army Sapper School" (08/12/11)
 "US Army 160th SOAR (A)" (08/19/11)
 "Naval Special Warfare Combatant Craft Crewman (CQT)" (08/26/11)

See also
SAS: Are You Tough Enough?
SAS: Who Dares Wins (2015-)

References
 Surviving the Cut : Discovery Channel
 Episode Guide : Surviving the Cut : Discovery Channel

Discovery Channel original programming
American military television series
2010 American television series debuts
English-language television shows
2011 American television series endings